The 2016 congressional election in the Northern Mariana Islands was held on Tuesday, November 8, 2016, to elect the territory's sole Delegate to the United States House of Representatives.

Incumbent Delegate Gregorio Sablan, an independent who caucuses with the Democratic Party, ran unopposed for re-election. Sablan, first elected in 2008, had held the seat since its creation in 2009.

The Northern Mariana Islands' non-voting delegate to the U.S. House of Representatives was elected for a two-year term. The election coincided with the elections of other federal and state offices, including the 2016 Northern Mariana Islands general election, as well as the nationwide 2016 United States House of Representatives elections and the 2016 United States general elections.

Candidates

Independent
Gregorio Sablan, incumbent Delegate for Northern Mariana Islands' at-large congressional district since 2009

General election
Sablan, who ran unopposed, won the November 2016 election.

See also
2016 United States House of Representatives elections
2016 Northern Mariana Islands general election

References

2016 Northern Mariana Islands elections
Northern Mariana Islands
2016